The paired (right and left) laterocaudal thalamic veins originate each from the lateral caudal part of the corresponding half of the thalamus. Benno Shlesinger in 1976 classified these veins as belonging to the lateral group of thalamic veins.

References 

Thalamic veins